Gustavo Leonardo Bou (born 18 February 1990) is an Argentine professional football player who plays as a forward for the New England Revolution in Major League Soccer.

Bou's professional career began in 2008 at the age of 18 with River Plate, under coach Diego Simeone. During his career he has played in Argentina, Ecuador, Mexico, and the United States.

While playing in Argentina, Bou was on the team that won the 2007–08 Toreno Clasura tournament, the 2011–12 Primera B Nacional with River Plate, the 2014 Torneo Transición and 2018–19 Primera División with Racing Club de Avellaneda ("Racing"). He was the top goal scorer in the 2015 Copa Libertadores with eight goals.

Bou is often referred to by his nickname La Pantera ("The Panther"). He has a tattoo of a panther on his left arm in honor of the moniker. When asked about its meaning in a 2019 interview, Bou compared his playing style to that of a panther, saying, "A panther is always ready to pounce on an opportunity... A panther does not leave. It hides."

Career

River Plate
Bou started his career in the youth ranks of Club Comunicaciones Concordia. At the age of 14, he joined River Plate's reserve team, where manager Diego Simeone later offered him a contract to join the senior team. On 23 March 2008, Bou made his debut for River Plate against Vélez Sarsfield. He played in the 43rd minute of the match, substituting for Mauro Rosales.

While Bou was with River Plate, he was called up for the 2007 U-17 World Cup in Korea, but was unable to participate due to a partial tear of a lateral ligament and meniscus.

Bou scored his first goal in a match against Newell's Old Boys on the 12th week of the Torneo Apertura 2008. He played sparingly during the 2010-11 season, and the team was later relegated to Primera B Nacional (Argentina's second division).

Olimpo

At the beginning of the 2012–13 Primera B Nacional season, Club Olimpo signed Bou on a loan. He debuted on 27 August 2012 against Gimnasia y Esgrima de Jujuy. In week 4, he scored his first goal for Olimpo.

Liga de Quito
Bou signed with Liga de Quito, on loan from River Plate, for the second round of the 2013 Campeonato Ecuatoriano de Fútbol Serie A, scoring his first brace (two goals in the same match) on 21 July against Barcelona Guayaquil.

Gimnasia La Plata
At the beginning of 2014, Bou signed with Gimnasia La Plata on a six-month loan from River Plate. At the end of the loan, he became a free agent.

Racing Club

2014 season
In August 2014, Bou signed as a free agent with Racing Club. This was a controversial move, as both Cocca and Bou were represented by the same agent, Christian Bragarnik. He played his first match on 26 August against Arsenal de Sarandí. Bou scored his first goal with Racing on 22 September against Newell's Old Boys.

2015 season

On 17 January 2015, Bou scored the first hat-trick (three goals in the same match) of his career against Boca Juniors in the Summer Tournament held in the city of Mar del Plata, and also won the player of the match award for that performance.

Bou made his Libertadores Cup debut against Deportivo Tachira where he was named the best player of the match for his hat trick and two assists.

2016 season

In the summer before the 2016 season, Bou refused to practice with the club after Blanco rejected a $5 million offer from Borussia Mönchengladbach. Bou reached an agreement with Racing to be sold if an $8 million offer was made for his contract. Later, Racing rejected an $8 million bid from Chinese Super League club Beijing Guoan for Bou, who voiced his frustration with Racing president Víctor Blanco for violating the agreement by rejecting the offer. Blanco later clarified that the $8 million figure was an after-tax amount and that Racing would therefore need an offer in the $10 million range, however, Bou did not agree with that interpretation.

Although he continued to be a Racing player, he stopped making appearances later in the season due to injuries and conflicts with the president of Racing Víctor Blanco.

2016-17 season
Despite the controversy over his contract, and with some changes in the club's staff, Bou signed a new contract expiring in 2020.

Tijuana de Mexico (2017–2018) 
On 26 June 2017, Bou joined Liga MX side Tijuana. On his decision to join "Xolos", Bou stated "I made my decision after the coaching staff called and made it clear it wanted to bring me here and the effort the front office made to get me here. I really value that." According to various Argentine media sources, Tijuana paid roughly $7 million for Bou's transfer. During his time in Mexico, he played 36 games, scored 10 goals and made six assists.

Second stint at Racing Club

2018–2019 season
In 2018, Racing Club brought Bou in on loan for one year for $2 million to replace Lautaro Martínez, who had just joined Inter Milan.

His first game was played against his former team, River Plate, for the 2018 Copa Libertadores. On 31 March 2019, he was awarded champion with Racing Club for the second time, even though he was no longer in the club. In the 2018–2019 season he scored only one goal and made three assists.

Return to Tijuana 

In 2019, Gustavo surprised many when he terminated his contract with Racing and returned to Tijuana. During this stint he played 19 games, scoring 11 goals.

New England Revolution
On 10 July 2019, Bou signed as a designated player with the New England Revolution for a club-record transfer fee, reportedly in the $6–7 million range. The Boston Globe reported that the deal included $12 million in transfer fees and guaranteed compensation; and could rise to "exceed $16 million" with bonuses and options.

Bou concluded the 2019 season with nine goals and two assists in 14 appearances. He added five more goals and three assists in 14 appearances in 2020.

Bou paid tribute to Diego Maradona after his second goal, laying an Argentine flag on the ground, pointing towards the sky, and kissing the flag.

Career statistics

Club

Honours 
River Plate
 Argentine Primera División: 2007–08 (Clausura)
 Primera B Nacional: 2011–12

Racing Club
 Argentine Primera División: 2014

New England Revolution
 Supporters' Shield: 2021

Individual
 MLS All-Star: 2021
 MLS Player of the Month: July 2021
 MLS Best XI: 2021

References

External links
  
  
 
 

1990 births
Living people
Argentine footballers
People from Concordia, Entre Ríos
Sportspeople from Entre Ríos Province

Association football forwards
Club Atlético River Plate footballers
Olimpo footballers
Club Tijuana footballers
New England Revolution players
L.D.U. Quito footballers
Club de Gimnasia y Esgrima La Plata footballers
Racing Club de Avellaneda footballers
Argentine Primera División players
Primera Nacional players
Ecuadorian Serie A players
Liga MX players
Argentine expatriate footballers
Expatriate footballers in Ecuador
Expatriate footballers in Mexico
Expatriate soccer players in the United States
Designated Players (MLS)
Major League Soccer players
Argentine expatriate sportspeople in Ecuador
Argentine expatriate sportspeople in Mexico
Argentine expatriate sportspeople in the United States